Sok An (16 April 1950 – 15 March 2017) was a Cambodian academic and politician. He was Deputy Prime Minister and Minister for the Office of the Council of Ministers from 2004 to his death, and started serving in the Cabinet in 1993. He was a Member of Parliament (MP) for Takéo and a member of the central committee of the Cambodian People's Party.

Early life
Samdech Vibol Panha Sok An was born in Kampong village, Preah Bat Chuan Chum commune, Kirivong district, Takeo province to a Hakka Chinese Cambodian family.

Education

An completed his secondary education in 1967, becoming a high school teacher. In 1969 was appointed as principal of a high school in Kirivong. He pursued higher education at the École Normale Supérieure in Phnom Penh, graduating with a bachelor's degree in Geography, History and Sociology in 1972. In 1972, he earned a High Diploma in Pedagogy. From 1973-75, he attended a high-ranking official training program in Diplomacy at the National School of Administration. In 2006, he was conferred an Honorary Doctoral Degree in Political Science from The University of Cambodia.

Professional career

In 1980, An served as personal secretary to Deputy Prime Minister and Minister of Foreign Affairs Hun Sen. In 1981, he was named Secretary-General of the Ministry of Foreign Affairs, and in 1983, as Secretary-General of the Cambodian National Peace Council. In 1985, he was posted as Cambodia’s Ambassador to India and, on his return to Cambodia in 1988, he was appointed as Deputy Minister of Foreign Affairs.

Then in 1991, he served as Deputy Minister of Interior and as Secretary General of the CPP-affiliated Supreme National Council for the national reconciliation and peace process in Cambodia. Following the general election organized by the United Nations Transitional Authority in Cambodia (UNTAC) in 1993, he was elected to the National Assembly as a Member of Parliament for Takeo constituency and was assigned as Minister in charge of the government office of the Royal Government in the first legislature. In 1998, he became the Minister in charge of the Office of the Council of Ministers. Appointed as Senior Minister in 1998, he was promoted to the rank of Deputy Prime Minister in 2004.

As Deputy Prime Minister and Minister in charge of the Office of the Council of Ministers, he had responsibility for a number of areas. He chaired the Accreditation Committee of Cambodia, a body created in 2003 with the support of the World Bank to reform and standardize the educational sector at graduate and post-graduate levels in Cambodia, as well as to initiate curriculum of the one-year foundation studies for university students. As Chairman of the Council of the Board of Engineers of Cambodia he led the organization through the current period of increasing prosperity in Cambodia. In late October 2012, the Council of the Board of ASEAN Federation of Engineering Organizations (AFEO) conferred upon him the AFEO Distinguished Honorary Fellow.

Sok An was actively engaged in negotiations with neighboring countries to address border issues and the development of petroleum and gas resources in areas of joint control. He also contributed his political intellect to finding solutions with other political parties and currents following various episodes of domestic political deadlock. He also fulfilled many other important duties, such as the Chairman of the Council for Administrative Reform, Chairman of the Council for Demobilization of Armed Forces, Co-chairman of the Council for Legal and Judicial Reform, Chairman of the Cambodian National Commission for UNESCO, Chairman of the Cambodian National Petroleum Authority (CNPA), Chairman of the Board of Royal School of Administration, Chairman of the Board of the Royal Academy for Judicial Professions, Deputy Chairman of the National Authority in charge of Border Affairs and Chairman of the Board of the Royal Academy of Cambodia and also team leader of academicians in the Royal Academy of Cambodia.

Sok An was highly honored in recognition of his contributions to peace processes, international cooperation, and the development of Cambodia, and hence he was conferred an Honorary Doctorate of Law in 1996 by Wesleyan College (Iowa, USA), an Honorary Doctorate of Public Administration in 2005 by Jeonju University (Republic of Korea) and was selected to be a member of the Russian Academy of Natural Sciences in 2002; an Honorary Doctorate of Political Sciences from the University of Cambodia in 2006; an Honorary Doctorate of Tourism Management from the National Economics University, Vietnam an Honorary Doctorate of Public Policy and Management from Chamroeun University of Poly-Technology, Cambodia, in 2007; an Honorary Doctorate of Education from the National University of the Philippines in 2008 and an Honorary Doctorate in Political Diplomacy from Woosuk University, Republic of Korea, in January 2010.

His involvement with Cultural Heritage was long-standing and diverse: as President of the APSARA National Authority, the governmental body that manages the 40,000 hectares of the Park of Angkor inscribed on the World Heritage List, he ensured the values that justified its inscription, and preserved a balance between the needs of conservation and the necessities of development. From the mid-1990s to the year of An's death, with the help of and in coordination with the ICC-Angkor, the APSARA National Authority received more than US$500 million in grants for the funding of some 70 projects from various countries and international communities.

As head of the Delegation of Cambodia, during the 31st regular session of the World Heritage Committee in Christchurch in 2007, An acquired considerable experience in both technical and personal terms through his active participation in the work of the Committee and through his relationships with his fellow Committee members. During the 31st regular session of the World Heritage Committee in Christchurch, in response to the presentation of the portfolio by the Cambodian delegation team led by An, the Committee recognized “that the Sacred Site of the Temple of Prasat Preah Vihear is of great international significance and has Outstanding Universal Value and agreed in principle that it should be inscribed on the World Heritage List” which led to its formal inscription by the Committee at its 32nd session in Canada in 2008.

Death
 
Sok An died at a medical center in Beijing on 15 March 2017 from an undisclosed illness, aged 66. He took a short leave of office in December 2016 while seeking medical treatment in Beijing.

An suffered from diabetes and other ailments at the time of his death.

Political career

In 1991, An served as the Director of Cabinet of the Central Committee of the Cambodian People’s Party (CPP) before being appointed as a member of the CPP’s central committee in July 1992, and then being appointed as a standing committee member of the Cambodian People’s Party in January 1996.
In July 2010, he was elected as Standing Committee member of the International Conference of Asian Political Parties (ICAPP) Standing Committee at the 13th ICAPP Standing Committee meeting in Kunming, Yunnan province, China.

In September 2014 in Colombo, Sri Lanka, he was unanimously elected to the new position of Vice-President of the Standing Committee and then later in 2015, in Vladivostok, he was elected as the Chairman of the ICAPP Cultural Council. In 2013, during the 4th General Assembly of Centrist Asia Pacific Democrats International (CAPDI) in Indonesia, he was named as Senior Vice President of CAPDI.

Personal life 
An was married to Lok Chumteav Annie Sok An and had five children, including Sok Puthyvuth and Sok Sokan. Lundy was related to Hun Sen by marriage; his son Sok Puthyvuth is married to Sen's daughter Hun Maly. Sokan is married to Sam Ang Leakena, whose family owns Vattanac Capital.

References

1950 births
2017 deaths
Cambodian People's Party politicians
Deputy Prime Ministers of Cambodia
Government ministers of Cambodia
People from Takéo province
Members of the National Assembly (Cambodia)
Ambassadors of Cambodia to India
Royal University of Phnom Penh alumni
Cambodian politicians of Chinese descent